Neilson Poe (October 1, 1876 – September 22, 1963) a.k.a. Net Poe was a football player for the Princeton Tigers. He played in the Princeton backfield  in 1895 and 1896, and even later returned to coach football at the school. He was also one of the Poe brothers, six siblings who were celebrated football players at Princeton University from 1882 until 1901. Neilson graduated from Princeton in 1897.

During World War I, Neilson served in the United States Army infantry as a lieutenant. In 1917, at the age of 41, he reported for officers training, located in Plattsburgh, New York. In 1918, Neilson took part in the Second Battle of the Marne, during which his commanding officer was killed. During the battle he was wounded, but still took command of his fellow soldiers and safely entrenched them for 24 hours. He suffered a bullet wound to the stomach and several shrapnel wounds. He spent the rest of the war hospitalized and was later awarded the French War Cross and the Distinguished Service Cross.

After the war, he returned to Princeton to serve as an assistant coach from 1919 until his death in 1963. He resided during those years in the Nassau Inn, room 24.

References

19th-century players of American football
Poe family (United States)
Players of American football from Baltimore
Princeton Tigers football coaches
Princeton Tigers football players
Princeton University alumni
United States Army soldiers
1963 deaths
United States Army personnel of World War I
Recipients of the Croix de Guerre 1914–1918 (France)
Recipients of the Distinguished Service Cross (United States)
1876 births